The following are the winners of the 14th annual ENnie Awards, held in 2014:

Judges' Spotlight Winners 
Hooper: Hobomancer Companion – Hex Games
Kayra Keri Kupcu:  Deep Magic – Kobold Press
Stacy Muth: Rocket Age RPG – Cubicle 7 Entertainment
Jakub Nowosad: The Demolished Ones – Chronicle City/Rite Publishing
Kurt Wiegel: Weird Wars Rome – Pinnacle Entertainment Group

Gold and Silver Winners

References

External links
 2014 ENnie Awards

 
ENnies winners